BPI may refer to:

In banking:
Banca Popolare Italiana, an Italian bank merged into Banco Popolare
Banco Português de Investimento, a Portuguese bank
Bank of the Philippine Islands, the oldest bank in the Philippines
Bpifrance, a French bank

In business:
Baltimore Polytechnic Institute, a public high school in Maryland, United States
Beef Products, Inc., manufacturer of lean finely textured beef, or LFTB.
British Phonographic Industry, a record industry trade association
British Power International, a UK-based power sector consultancy
Bundesverband der Pharmazeutischen Industrie, the German trade group for the pharmaceutical industry
Burma Pharmaceutical Industry, a pharmaceutical brand name in Myanmar

In measurement:
 Base peak intensity, a type of mass chromatogram
 Bits-per-inch or bytes-per-inch, used to specify the data density of magnetic tape
Bomb Power Indicator, used by the Royal Observer Corps during the Cold War to detect nuclear explosions
Brief Pain Inventory, used to measure the change in pain intensity after treatment, for example, with anti-cancer drugs

BPI may also be:
Bard Prison Initiative, an inmate college degree program offered by Bard College
Baseline Privacy Interface, a MAC layer security service
Biodegradable Products Institute, an organization that provides technically and scientifically credible certifications for materials that biodegrade in biologically active environments
Bipolar I disorder
Boolean prime ideal theorem, a mathematical theorem
Brachial plexus injury, an injury to the nerves that conduct signals from the spinal cord to the shoulder, arm and hand
 Branch on Program Interrupt, a simulated IBM S/360 and S/370 instruction under the Michigan Terminal System, an early mainframe computer operating system 
Business process interoperability, a state that exists when a business process can meet a specific objective automatically utilizing essential human labor only
Bureau of Plant Industry (Philippines)
Bactericidal/permeability-increasing protein, an endogenous antibiotic protein that is part of the innate immune system